Nataliia Zharkova (born 24 January 1989) is a 2017 freediving champion of Europe and Ukraine. Zharkova holds multiple records in the discipline of freediving. She was also a freediving runner-up champion of the world in 2013. She is the first Ukrainian and the second woman to ever dive below the arch of the Blue Hole vertical underwater cave in Dahab, Egypt, on a single breath.

Biography

Swimming career, 1997–2007 

Zharkova started swimming at the age of seven, when her parents introduced her to swimming to alleviate her spinal medical condition. Within six months she was accepted for the school of Olympic Reserve of Ukraine where she spent a total of 10 years.

Zharkova represented Ukraine in various European swimming championships while attending the school of Olympic Reserve of Ukraine.

Freediving career 2008–present 

In 2008 Zharkova was introduced to freediving and began active training.

In 2009, she participated in a world championship held at Aarhus, Denmark. Zharkova set new Ukraine's national records in freediving.

In 2010, Zharkova competed in Ukraine, Russia and Latvia. Each participation brought Zharkova a new Ukraine's national record.

In 2011, the first depth competitions AIDA International World Championship were held at Kalamata, Greece. Zharkova's first participation in the depth competitions put her near the top freedivers in the discipline, taking 6th place in the CNF discipline (constant weight, no fins). She also set new Ukraine national records in the discipline.

In 2012, Ukraine first participated in the team world championship event, held in Nice, France. Zharkova represented Ukraine along with Alexander Bubenchikov and Valentin Kuznetsov. Zharkova improved her previous national records and took 5th place in the world rating.

In 2013, the AIDA International World Championships were held in Kalamata, Greece. Zharkova along with Natalia Molchanova won medals in all of the disciplines of the championship.

 Silver – CNF (Constant weight apnea without fins), 60m
 Silver – FIM (Free immersion apnea), 78m
 Bronze – CWT (Constant weight apnea, Bi-fins), 85m

In 2013–2015, Zharkova was a finalist in the Pool World Championship held at Belgrad, Serbia. 

In 2015, the AIDA International Depth World Championships were held at Limassol, Cyprus. Zharkova's results were
 Bronze – FIM (Free immersion apnea)
 Bronze – CWT (Constant weight apnea, with a monofin)

In 2017, Zharkova won two gold and one bronze medal at the Championship of Europe held at Kaş, Turkey. She set two new world records according to CMAS. All dives of that championship were filmed with the Dive Eye underwater drone.

 CWT (Constant weight apnea, Bi-fins) – 85m 2 ming 51 sec – gold, world record
 CNF (Constant weight apnea without fins) – 65m 2 ming 41 sec – gold, world record

Current activities 

Currently Zharkova is a master Instructor at AIDA International, instructor (Emergency First Response-EFR). She is a chairman of the Freediving committee at UFUA (Ukrainian Federation of Underwater Activities) and is a member of the CMAS international committee. She is an author of multiple training programs and a coach at the Deep Division freediving school in Kharkiv, Ukraine. Zharkova conducts training in warm climate locations, most notably in  Dahab, Egypt and actively prepares for upcoming competitions.

Personal records 

 DYN, Dynamic apnea with fins – 172 meters
 DNF, Dynamic apnea without fins – 132 meters 
 FIM, Free immersion apnea – 82 meters, National record of Ukraine
 CWT, Constant weight apnea – 95 meters, National record of Ukraine
 STA, Static Apnea – 6 minutes 02 seconds, National record of Ukraine
 CWT, Constant weight apnea, Bi-fins – 85 meters, CMAS World record
 CNF, Constant weight apnea without fins – 65 meters, CMAS World record

Education 

Zharkova graduated from Kharkiv State Technical University of Construction and Architecture in 2012 with a BSc in architecture.

Notable achievements

Swimming underneath the arch of Blue Hole 

On 27 October 2016, Zharkova became the first Ukrainian and the second woman in the world (after Natalia Molchanova) to dive through an underwater vertical cave known as Blue Hole on a single breath. Zharkova immersed to a depth of 56 meters and then swam 30 meters under the arch.

References

External links
 
 

1989 births
Freedivers
Living people
Sportspeople from Kharkiv